Teinoptila interruptella is a moth of the  family Yponomeutidae. It is found in Southeast Asia, including the Philippines and Queensland, Australia.

External links
Australian Faunal Directory
Australian Insects
CSIRO Entomology

Yponomeutidae